In differential topology, a branch of mathematics, a stratifold is a generalization of a differentiable manifold where certain kinds of singularities are allowed. More specifically a stratifold is stratified into differentiable manifolds of (possibly) different dimensions. Stratifolds can be used to construct new homology theories. For example, they provide a new geometric model for ordinary homology. The concept of stratifolds was invented by Matthias Kreck. The basic idea is similar to that of a topologically stratified space, but adapted to differential topology.

Definitions

For a general differential space  and a point x in X we can define as in the case of manifolds a tangent space  as the vector space of all derivations of function germs at x. Define strata  has dimension i For an n-dimensional manifold M we have that  and all other strata are empty. We are now ready for the definition of a stratifold, where more than one stratum may be non-empty:

A k-dimensional stratifold is a differential space  where S is a locally compact Hausdorff space with countable base of topology. All skeleta should be closed. In addition we assume:

 The  are i-dimensional smooth manifolds.
 For all x in S, restriction defines an isomorphism of stalks 
 All tangent spaces have dimension ≤ k.

A n-dimensional stratifold is called oriented if its (n − 1)-stratum is empty and its top stratum is oriented. One can also define stratifolds with boundary, the so-called c-stratifolds.

An important subclass of stratifolds are the regular stratifolds, which can be roughly characterized as looking locally around a point in the i-stratum like the i-stratum times a (n − i)-dimensional stratifold. This is a condition which is fulfilled in most stratifold one usually encounters.

Examples

There are plenty of examples of stratifolds. The last condition is automatic by point 2 in the definition of a stratifold. We can substitute M by a stratifold S in this construction. The cone is oriented if and only if S is oriented and not zero-dimensional. If we consider the (closed) cone with bottom, we get a stratifold with boundary S.

Other examples for stratifolds are one-point compactifications and suspensions of manifolds, (real) algebraic varieties with only isolated singularities and (finite) simplicial complexes.

Bordism theories

In this section, we will assume all stratifolds to be regular. We call two maps  from two oriented compact k-dimensional stratifolds into a space X bordant if there exists an oriented (k + 1)-dimensional compact stratifold T with boundary S + (−S') such that the map to X extends to T. The set of equivalence classes of such maps  is denoted by  The sets have actually the structure of abelian groups with disjoint union as addition. One can develop enough differential topology of stratifolds to show that these define a homology theory. Clearly,  for  since every oriented stratifold S is the boundary of its cone, which is oriented if  One can show that  Hence, by the Eilenberg–Steenrod uniqueness theorem,  for every space X homotopy-equivalent to a CW-complex, where H denotes singular homology. For other spaces these two homology theories need not be isomorphic (an example is the one-point compactification of the surface of infinite genus).

There is also a simple way to define equivariant homology with the help of stratifolds. Let G be a compact Lie group. We can then define a bordism theory of stratifolds mapping into a space X with a G-action just as above, only that we require all stratifolds to be equipped with an orientation-preserving free G-action and all maps to be G-equivariant. Denote by  the bordism classes. One can prove  for every X homotopy equivalent to a CW-complex.

Connection to the theory of genera

A genus is a ring homomorphism from a bordism ring into another ring. For example, the Euler characteristic defines a ring homomorphism  from the unoriented bordism ring and the signature defines a ring homomorphism  from the oriented bordism ring. Here t has in the first case degree 1 and in the second case degree 4, since only manifolds in dimensions divisible by 4 can have non-zero signature. The left hand sides of these homomorphisms are homology theories evaluated at a point. With the help of stratifolds it is possible to construct homology theories such that the right hand sides are these homology theories evaluated at a point, the Euler homology and the Hirzebruch homology respectively.

Umkehr maps

Suppose, one has a closed embedding  of manifolds with oriented normal bundle. Then one can define an umkehr map  One possibility is to use stratifolds: represent a class  by a stratifold  Then make ƒ transversal to N. The intersection of S and N defines a new stratifold S' with a map to N, which represents a class in  It is possible to repeat this construction in the context of an embedding of Hilbert manifolds of finite codimension, which can be used in string topology.

References

 M. Kreck, Differential Algebraic Topology: From Stratifolds to Exotic Spheres, AMS (2010), 
 The stratifold page
 Euler homology

Generalized manifolds
Homology theory
Stratifications